Andrea Jutson is a writer who was born and raised in Auckland, New Zealand. She has published two crime novels featuring reticent medium James Paxton, Senseless (Random House, 2005) and The Darkness Looking Back (Random House, 2008). She was also short-listed for the 2011 Tessa Duder Award for New Zealand young adult literature for her unpublished manuscript, Cursed. Jutson has loved reading and writing her entire life, and was a bookseller for eight years, before working as a journalist for The Aucklander. She has also reviewed literature for the Scoop news website in New Zealand, and is now working in collection development at Auckland Libraries.

Writing 
In 2005, Jutson's debut novel Senseless was published - a psychic-tinged crime thriller set in Auckland, which introduced reluctant medium and English immigrant James Paxton. Paxton finds the body of a man bludgeoned to death, a dead man who then asks him to track down his killer, for the sake of his daughter. Jutson's debut received good reviews, including a comment from major New Zealand newspaper The Sunday Star-Times comparing her to Ruth Rendell and Jeffery Deaver.

In 2008 Jutson released the follow-up to Senseless, again featuring Paxton and Detective Constable Andy Stirling. In The Darkness Looking Back, Paxton and Stirling find themselves knee-deep in another murder mystery after a pizza delivery boy stumbles across a body at a house in the Auckland suburbs. Stirling, stumped by the grisly but seemingly motiveless crime, visits Paxton, hoping for ‘unofficial’ help. When another bashed and stabbed body is found by another delivery-person, the case quickly takes a more sinister twist, especially when it becomes apparent a game-playing serial killer is targeting unfaithful women. Paxton’s involvement is leaked to the media and public hysteria ensues – complicating both Paxton’s personal life, and an already difficult investigation for Stirling and his NZ Police colleagues.

 
The Paxton series was cancelled after two novels. Jutson has since begun two young adult novels and two further works of crime fiction.

Crime novels 
 2005: Senseless
 2008: The Darkness Looking Back

Reviews 
"I loved how I could visualise every scene from the book and the locations weren’t your average Auckland icons, either... Andrea Jutson writes with authority and compassion ...Senseless is a strong, thoughtful crime novel that stands out from the crowd" Clea Marshall, nzgirl magazine 

"One of the best things ... is Jutson’s depiction and use of Paxton and his psychic abilities. Neither contrived nor clichéd, Paxton is a fascinating and reasonably complex character - not a cardboard cutout of the average “psychic” tabloid columnist or wannabe TV celebrity... Topped off nicely by moments of humour and domesticity that provide a breather from the dark deeds, it’s an enjoyable local read for crime fiction fans." Craig Sisterson, NZLawyer magazine

References

External links
 NZ Book Month blog

People from Auckland
Living people
New Zealand crime fiction writers
New Zealand women novelists
Year of birth missing (living people)
21st-century New Zealand novelists
21st-century New Zealand women writers
Women crime fiction writers
New Zealand booksellers